The Euro Hockey League is an annual men's field hockey cup competition organized by the EHF for the very top field hockey clubs in Europe. The competition was launched at the start of the 2007-08 field hockey season when it merged and replaced the men's EuroHockey Club Champions Cup (the champions competition) and the EuroHockey Cup Winners Cup (the Cup Winners' competition). Featuring many of the world's best players, the EHL is now seen as the pinnacle of club hockey in Europe (hockey's equivalent of the UEFA Champions League) with top clubs from across the continent playing what many consider to be the most exciting and dynamic club hockey in the world.

The competition has been won by eight clubs, two of which have won it more than once. Bloemendaal is the most successful clubs in the tournament's history; having won it five times. The Waterloo Ducks became the first Belgian club to win the tournament. Dutch clubs have the highest number of victories (8 wins), followed by Germany (5 wins).

Format
From the 2019–20 season onwards the tournament features 20 clubs from the 11 highest-ranked EHF member countries. Although the competition is called the Euro Hockey League, after round 1 the competition was a knock-out, rather than league format (similar to the UEFA Champions League in football). From the 2019–20 season onwards round one is also a knock-out format.

Qualification
From the 2019–20 season onwards each year the 20 available league places are allocated between 11 EHF member countries' National Associations, depending on those National Associations' EHF Club Ranking. National Associations ranked 1–3 in the EHL Ranking Table may enter three teams each in the Euro Hockey League, while National Associations ranked 4-6 may enter two teams each, and National Associations ranked 7-11 one team.

National Associations rankings are derived from each country's results in the Euro Hockey League and EuroHockey Club Trophy over the previous 3 years, with the points in the earlier years discounted by 50% (year 2) and 75% (year 1). This ranking of National Associations is based on the performance of all their clubs in the Euro Hockey League and EuroHockey Club Trophy. The total number of points won by clubs from each country is divided by the number of clubs to which the National Association was entitled in that year's competitions.

Each qualifying National Association is required to enter their national champion club but is otherwise free to decide the system of qualification for their own clubs for any remaining places to which they are entitled that year.

To be eligible to play in the Euro Hockey League a country must enter 2 clubs in the EHF club competitions.

Tournament 
For the 2019–20 season the EHL moves to a new format with the removal of the round-robin tournament in round one. Instead, a knock-out format will be used from the start of the tournament. Round one will be replaced by the knockout 16 with four sides advancing to the quarter-finals, or Final 8 as it's called, on Easter.  The Final8 will consist of the champions from the top four nations on the EHL rankings table alongside the four sides that qualified from the knockout 16.  This means that instead of a total of 24 teams from 12 associations there will be 20 teams from 11 associations.

Sponsorship
The much-improved presentation and packaging of the Euro Hockey League have attracted a number of high-profile sponsors, most notably Dutch bank ABN-AMRO, who are the presenting sponsor of the tournament. Volvo and Intersport are also named sponsors of the Euro Hockey League, while partnerships have been formed with McGregor, ErmaSport, ATP - The Advanced Travel Partner and Dutch advertising agency Ideas for Brands.

Summaries

Records and statistics

Performances by club

Performances by nation

Lower tournaments
The Euro Hockey League is the top men's club competition in Europe. Below the Euro Hockey League is the EuroHockey Club Trophy, then below that the EuroHockey Club Challenge 1, the EuroHockey Club Challenge 2, and so on. This structure is designed to give every EHF member nation the opportunity to enter their best clubs into European competition at an appropriate level, and through that exposure to improve the level of their domestic hockey.

See also
 EuroHockey Club Champions Cup
 EuroHockey Club Trophy
 Men's EuroHockey Indoor Club Cup
 Women's Euro Hockey League

References

External links
Official website

 
   
International club field hockey competitions in Europe
Sports leagues established in 2007
2007 establishments in Europe
Multi-national professional sports leagues